Pee-wee's Big Adventure is a 1985 American adventure comedy film directed by Tim Burton in his feature-film directing debut. It stars Paul Reubens as Pee-wee Herman, who also co-wrote the screenplay with Phil Hartman and Michael Varhol, along with E.G. Daily, Mark Holton, Diane Salinger, and Judd Omen. Described as a "parody" or "farce version" of the 1948 Italian classic Bicycle Thieves, it tells the story of Pee-wee's nationwide search for his stolen bicycle.

After the success of The Pee-wee Herman Show, Reubens began writing the script for Pee-wee's Big Adventure when he was hired by the Warner Bros. film studio. Impressed with Burton's work on the short films Vincent and Frankenweenie, the producers and Reubens hired him to direct. Filming took place in California and Texas.

The film was released on August 9, 1985, grossing over $40 million in North America. It became a cult film and continued to accumulate positive feedback. It was nominated for a Young Artist Award and spawned two stand-alone sequels, Big Top Pee-wee (1988) and Pee-wee's Big Holiday (2016). Its financial success, followed by the equally successful Beetlejuice in 1988, prompted Warner Bros. to hire Burton to direct the 1989 film Batman.

Plot

Pee-wee Herman has a heavily accessorized bicycle that he treasures and that his neighbor and enemy, Francis Buxton, covets. Dottie, an employee at a bike shop, has a crush on Pee-wee, but he does not reciprocate.

Pee-wee's bike is stolen while he is shopping at a mall, but the police tell Pee-wee they cannot help him find it. Pee-wee assumes Francis took it, and confronts him, but Francis' father convinces Pee-wee that Francis was at home when the bike was stolen. Pee-wee offers a $10,000 reward for the bike. Francis, who did indeed pay to have someone steal the bike, is disturbed by Pee-wee's relentlessness and pays to have the bike sent away. That evening, Pee-wee holds an unsuccessful evidentiary meeting of friends and neighbors to find the bike, then rejects offers of help. He then visits a psychic who, spying a bargain basement across the street, tells Pee-wee that his bike is in the basement of the Alamo Mission in San Antonio.

Pee-wee hitchhikes to Texas, getting rides from a fugitive convict named Mickey, and from Large Marge, the ghost of a truck driver. At a truck stop, Pee-wee finds his wallet is missing, and pays for his meal by washing dishes. He befriends Simone, a waitress who dreams of visiting Paris. As they watch the sun rise from within a roadside dinosaur statue, he encourages her to follow her dreams, but Simone tells him about her boyfriend, Andy, who disapproves. Andy himself appears and tries to attack Pee-wee, who escapes onto a moving train. Pee-wee arrives at the Alamo, but learns at the end of a guided tour that the building does not have a basement.

At a bus station, Pee-wee encounters Simone, who tells him she broke up with Andy and is on her way to Paris. She tells Pee-wee not to give up searching for his bike. Pee-wee calls Dottie at the bike shop and apologizes for his behavior. Andy spots Pee-wee and resumes chasing him. Pee-wee evades Andy at a rodeo by disguising himself as a bull rider. Forced to ride a bull, Pee-wee nearly sets a world record but receives a concussion. He visits a biker bar to make a phone call, and a biker gang known as The Satan's Helpers threatens to kill him after he accidentally knocks over their motorcycles. He wins them over by dancing to the song "Tequila" in a pair of platform shoes, and they give him a motorcycle for his journey, which he crashes immediately.

He awakens in a hospital and sees a television news report in which his bike is being used as a prop in a film. Pee-wee sneaks into Warner Bros. Studios with Milton Berle in Burbank and grabs the bike. Security guards chase him across the studio lot and through several active sets before he escapes.

Having escaped the lot, Pee-wee discovers a burning pet shop and rescues the animals. The firefighters declare Pee-wee a hero, but the police tells them he's a criminal and arrest Pee-wee for his intrusion at the studio. They return Pee-wee to the studio to face Warner Bros. president Terry Hawthorne. After Pee-wee pleads his case that the bike belongs to him, Hawthorne decides to drop the charges and return Pee-wee's bike in exchange for the rights to adapt his story into a film starring James Brolin as "P.W. Herman" and Morgan Fairchild as Dottie. In the film, the characters must retrieve their stolen motorbike – which contains an important microfilm – from the Soviets. Pee-wee has a bit role as a hotel bellhop, though his voice has been dubbed.

Seeing the film at a drive-in theater, Pee-wee gives refreshments to the different people he met along his journey, then joins Dottie at their bikes. He also encounters Francis, who tells reporters he is Pee-wee's best friend and that he taught Pee-wee how to ride. Francis claims to be knowledgeable about Pee-wee's bike, but sets off one of the bicycle's gadgets, catapulting himself into the air.

Pee-wee wants to leave the drive-in, and Dottie asks why he is not staying to watch the rest of the film. Pee-wee answers "I don't have to see it, Dottie. I lived it." He and Dottie then ride off together silhouetted against the screen.

Cast

 Paul Reubens as Pee-wee Herman, a child-like man whose bike is stolen.
 E.G. Daily as Dottie, a bike shop employee who is Pee-wee's friend.
 Mark Holton as Francis Buxton, a man-child who is Pee-wee's enemy and neighbor.
 Diane Salinger as Simone, a waitress who dreams of visiting France.
 Judd Omen as Mickey Morelli, an escaped convict who was incarcerated for tearing a tag off a mattress.
 Irving Hellman as Mr. Crabtree
 Erica Yohn as Madame Ruby, a psychic.
 Alice Nunn as Large Marge, a truck driver.
 Phil Hartman as Reporter
 John Harris as Andy, Simone's possessive boyfriend.
 Daryl Keith Roach as Chuck
 Carmen Filpi as Jack, a hobo that Pee-wee meets on a train.
 Starletta DuPois as Sgt. Hunter
 Professor Toru Tanaka as the unnamed butler of the Buxton family
 Ed Herlihy as Mr. Buxton, the father of Francis
 Jan Hooks as Tina
 Ralph Seymour as Francis' Accomplice, the guy who steals Pee-Wee's bike and sells it to Warner Bros. Studios.
 Jason Hervey as Kevin Morton, a bratty child star.
 Tony Bill as Terrance "Terry" Hawthorne, the president of Warner Bros. Studios.
 Lynne Marie as an actress who portrays the "Mother Superior" in Kevin Morton's film
 John Paragon as Man in Red Armor
 George Sasaki as Japanese Director
 Richard Brose as an actor portraying Tarzan
 Lou Cutell as Amazing Larry
 Cleve Hall as an actor in the Godzilla suit (uncredited)
 Cleve Hall also does an uncredited portrayal as a member of the Satan's Helpers.

 Darla as Pink Poodle (uncredited)

Michael Varhol, who co-wrote the script with Reubens and Hartman, cameos as a photographer. Director Tim Burton has an uncredited cameo as the street thug who confronts Pee-wee in a rainy back alley. Cassandra Peterson (a.k.a. Elvira, Mistress of the Dark) portrays the Biker Mama of Satan's Helpers. James Brolin portrays P.W. Herman and Morgan Fairchild is Dottie in the film-within-a-film production about Pee-wee's life. Heavy metal band Twisted Sister and veteran comedy star Milton Berle cameo as themselves with the latter being uncredited.

The film contains numerous "conceptual continuity" links to other Tim Burton films and other productions:

 Several cast members from The Pee-wee Herman Show (who went on to appear in Pee-wee's Playhouse) have cameo roles. John Moody (Mailman Mike in The Pee-wee Herman Show) appears as the bus clerk in the film-studio sequence, Lynne Marie Stewart (Miss Yvonne) plays the Mother Superior, John Paragon (Jambi the Genie) plays the high-voiced studio extra in red armor of whom Pee-wee asks directions and the reporter interviewing Francis in the final scene at the drive-in is played by Phil Hartman (Cap'n Carl).
 Jan Hooks (Tina) was a fellow member of The Groundlings comedy troupe with Reubens, Hartman and Paragon, and went on to costar on Saturday Night Live with Hartman. She also had a cameo role as a publicist in Burton's Batman Returns.
 Reubens and Diane Salinger (Simone) were reunited in the opening sequence of Burton's Batman Returns in which they portrayed the parents of the Penguin. They appeared together again in Pee-wee's Big Holiday.

Production

The success of The Pee-wee Herman Show prompted Warner Bros. to hire Paul Reubens to write a script for a full-length Pee-wee Herman film. His original concept was a remake of Pollyanna (1960), Reubens' favorite film, with Pee-wee Herman in the Hayley Mills role. While writing the script, Reubens noticed that many at Warner Bros. rode bicycles around the backlot and requested one of his own. This inspired Reubens to start a new script.

Having left Walt Disney Productions and with Frankenweenie receiving positive reviews within film studios, Tim Burton was seeking a full-length film to direct. When Reubens and the producers of Pee-wee's Big Adventure saw Burton's work on Vincent and Frankenweenie, they decided to hire him. Burton felt that he connected with Reubens' personality and the humor of the Pee-wee Herman Show. After hiring Burton, Reubens, Phil Hartman and Michael Varhol revised the script. They read Syd Field's classic book Screenplay and wrote the script according to the book's advice. "It's a 90-minute film, it's a 90-page script," Reubens explained. "On page 30 I lose my bike, on page 60 I find it. It's literally exactly what they said to do in the book...There should be like a MacGuffin kind of a thing, something you're looking for, and I was like, 'Okay, my bike.'"

Filming locations included Glendale, Pomona, Santa Clarita, Santa Monica, Burbank, Cabazon (at the Cabazon Dinosaurs) and Port Hueneme in California as well as San Antonio, Texas. Burton and Reubens clashed with Warner Bros. studio executives over the shooting schedule. Burton hired CalArts classmate Rick Heinrichs for scenes involving stop-motion animation. Large Marge's claymation transformation was created by the Chiodo Brothers.

Soundtrack

Burton brought in Danny Elfman, the lead singer/songwriter of Oingo Boingo who had composed the music for Forbidden Zone, to compose the film's score. Elfman was hesitant at first given his lack of scoring experience, but had written the main title theme by the time that he signed on.

Elfman's original score draws inspiration from film composers Nino Rota and Bernard Herrmann; the main title music pays homage to Rota's "Carlotta's Galop" from Fellini's 8½ and the tracks "Stolen Bike" and "Clown Dream" pay homage to Herrmann's scores for Psycho and The 7th Voyage of Sinbad respectively. "Studio Chase" pays homage to Miss Gulch's theme from The Wizard of Oz.

In 1986, record label Varèse Sarabande released an album featuring cues from Pee-wee's Big Adventure and those from another Elfman-scored film, Back to School (1986). While the scores for both films were recorded in Hollywood, the album was recorded in London and performed by the National Philharmonic Orchestra, conducted by John Coleman. In 2010, many of the original tracks were released by Warner Bros. Records as part of The Danny Elfman & Tim Burton 25th Anniversary Music Box.

Elfman went on to score nearly all of Burton's films, excluding Ed Wood, Sweeney Todd: The Demon Barber of Fleet Street and Miss Peregrine's Home for Peculiar Children.

"Clown Dream" is also featured in the video game Grand Theft Auto V and is often played as the opening music during Primus concerts.

The film also features "Burn in Hell" by Twisted Sister and "Tequila" by the Champs.

Reception
Pee-wee's Big Adventure opened on August 9, 1985 in the United States in 829 theaters, accumulating $4,545,847 over its opening weekend. It went on to gross $40,940,662 domestically.

Critical response 
Pee-wee's Big Adventure received generally positive reviews on its release before eventually becoming a cult film. As of May 2020, Rotten Tomatoes reports that 87% of 46 critics gave it a positive review, with an average rating of 7.85/10. The critical consensus reads: "Pee-Wee's Big Adventure brings Paul Reubens' famous character to the big screen intact, along with enough inspired silliness to dazzle children of all ages." By comparison, Metacritic calculated an average score of 47 from 14 reviews, indicating "mixed or average reviews". The film was nominated for a Young Artist Award for Best Family Motion Picture (Comedy or Musical).

Christopher Null gave positive feedback, calling it "Burton's strangest film". Variety compared Paul Reubens to Charlie Chaplin and Buster Keaton, while Empire called the film "a one-comic masterpiece" and "a dazzling debut" for Burton. Stephanie Zacharek of Salon.com explained: "Everything about Pee-wee's Big Adventure, from its toy-box colors to its superb, hyper-animated Danny Elfman score to the butch-waxed hairdo and wooden-puppet walk of its star and mastermind is pure pleasure." Burton was offered the opportunity to direct Big Top Pee-wee, but was not interested and was already working on his own pet project, Beetlejuice. Positive reviews for Beetlejuice and the financial success of Pee-wee's Big Adventure prompted Warner Bros. to hire Burton to direct Batman.

Roger Ebert of The Chicago Sun-Times did not review Pee-wee's Big Adventure upon its original release. In 1987 the film topped his Guilty Pleasures list, saying he was impressed by "how innocent, how playful and how truly eccentric" the film was, and how the film created "a whole fairy-tale universe" comparable to Alice in Wonderland or Lord of the Rings. Ebert also mentioned Big Adventure in his review of Big Top Pee-wee (1988), explaining how moving away from the "zany weirdness" of the first Pee-wee Herman film led to a sequel that was "not as magical". In a review for the Los Angeles Times, Michael Wilmington wrote, "The wrong crowd will find these antics infantile and offensive. The right one will have a howling good time." David Ansen of Newsweek described the film as "Mattel Surrealism, a toy-store fantasia in primary colors and '50s decor. Whoever proposed teaming up Pee-wee (a.k.a. Paul Reubens) with 26-year-old director Tim Burton knew what they were doing ... Together they've conspired to make a true original—a live-action cartoon brash enough to appeal to little kids and yet so knee-deep in irony that its faux naivete looks as chic as the latest retrofashions."

A more negative assessment came Gene Siskel of The Chicago Tribune, who gave Pee-wee's Big Adventure a rare zero-star rating in his print review, writing that he had enjoyed Herman's guest spots on Late Night with David Letterman but "[o]bviously, Pee-Wee is tolerable only in Pee-Wee doses ... You have to be a lot funnier on the big screen than on the tube to sustain a feature-length story." Siskel included the film in his unranked year-end list of the worst movies of 1985. Vincent Canby of The New York Times was also negative, writing that apart from a couple of scenes it was "the most barren comedy I've seen in years, maybe ever."

Home video
Warner Home Video released Pee-wee's Big Adventure on DVD in May 2000, with audio commentary by Tim Burton, Paul Reubens and Danny Elfman (the latter on a separate track, alongside an isolated score) and some deleted scenes. The film was released on Blu-ray disc in 2011.

References

External links

 
 
 
 
 

1980s adventure comedy films
1980s comedy road movies
1980s English-language films
1985 films
1985 comedy films
1985 directorial debut films
American films with live action and animation
American adventure comedy films
American ghost films
American comedy road movies
Films directed by Tim Burton
Films scored by Danny Elfman
Films set in California
Films set in Los Angeles
Films set in San Antonio
Films set in Texas
Films with screenplays by Paul Reubens
Films with screenplays by Michael Varhol
Films using stop-motion animation
Pee-wee Herman
Self-reflexive films
Warner Bros. films
1980s American films